Jayantha Chandrasiri Jayasuriya PC is a lawyer who is serving as the 47th Chief Justice of Sri Lanka since 2019. Jayasuriya was approved by the Constitutional Council on the 26 April 2019 and sworn in three days later on the 29 April, succeeding Chief Justice Nalin Perera. He previously served as the 45th Attorney General of Sri Lanka. While serving as Attorney General Jayasuriya defended the sacking of the Prime Minister by the President of Sri Lanka but was over-ruled by the Supreme Court. Jayasuriya controversially requested an extension of the term of office of President Sirisena prior to being made Chief Justice. The Supreme Court overruled that request.

Jayasuriya took oath as an Attorney-at-Law of the Supreme Court of Sri Lanka in 1982. He joined the Attorney General’s Department as a State Counsel and held the posts of Senior State Counsel, Deputy Solicitor General, Additional Solicitor General, and Senior Additional Solicitor General before being appointed as Attorney General. Jayasuriya studied at Maliyadeva College.

References

Living people
Year of birth missing (living people)
W
Chief justices of Sri Lanka
President's Counsels (Sri Lanka)
Sinhalese lawyers